Sir Paulet St John, 1st Baronet (7 April 1704 – 8 June 1780) was a British politician who sat in the House of Commons between 1734 and 1754.

Life 
He was born the eldest son of Ellis St John (formerly Mews) of Farley Chamberlayne by his second wife Martha, the daughter and eventually heiress of Edward Goodyear of Dogmersfield Park, Dogmersfield, Hampshire. He was educated at Oriel College, Oxford (1722) and inherited his father's estates in 1729. He completed the building, started by his father, of the new house at Dogmersfield.

He was pricked High Sheriff of Hampshire for 1727–28, appointed woodward of the New Forest in 1764 and elected Mayor of Winchester for 1772–73. He was also created a Baronet in 1772.

He was returned to Parliament as the member for Winchester in 1734, sitting until 1741. He was elected to serve Hampshire from 1741 to 1747 and Winchester again from 1751 to 1754.

He died in 1780.

Family 
He married three times: firstly Elizabeth, the daughter of Sir James Rushout, 2nd Baronet, MP, of Northwick Park, Worcestershire; secondly Mary, the daughter of John Waters of Brecon and the widow of Sir Halswell Tynte, 3rd Baronet, with whom he had 3 sons; and thirdly Jane, the daughter and heiress of R. Harris of Silkstead, Hampshire and widow of William Pescod of Winchester. He was succeeded in the baronetcy by his son Henry.

See also 

 St John baronets

References

|-

1705 births
1780 deaths
People from Hart District
Alumni of Oriel College, Oxford
Baronets in the Baronetage of Great Britain
Members of the Parliament of Great Britain for English constituencies
British MPs 1734–1741
British MPs 1741–1747
British MPs 1747–1754
High Sheriffs of Hampshire
Mayors of Winchester